Song for America is the second studio album by American progressive rock band Kansas, released in 1975. The album was reissued in remastered format on CD in 2004. The 10-minute title track was edited down to three minutes for release as a single. The 45 R.P.M. edit resurfaced 29 years later as a bonus track on the remastered release, which provided improved sound as well as expanded liner notes, rare photos, and a live version of "Down the Road".

Reception 

AllMusic, in a retrospective review, praised the "intense energy" of the album's shorter songs, but contended that the longer songs require too much active listening to appreciate. They concluded that the album is "a good (if not adolescent) recording for a group of this genre." Conversely, Gary Graff described the title track as "one of prog-rock's sonic gems," recommending the album to "Those interested in Kansas at its most bombastic."

Steve Pettengill, writing for Sea of Tranquility webzine, describes the album as "full tilt symphonic rock with none of the stadium rock numbers that would pop up on later albums. Comprising four lengthy intricate pieces and two very American style romps, Kansas' second album very admirably showcases the band's trademark duality as proggers and rockers."

Ranking on the Billboard album chart with a peak of #57, Song for America would in the months subsequent to its February 1975 release sell approximately 250,000 units.  Like all three of Kansas' first three album releases, Song for America attracted new commercial interest due to the platinum success of the band's fourth and fifth studio albums: Leftoverture (1976) and Point of Know Return (1977): reported as having sold between 300,000 and 400,000 units in January 1978, Song for America would be certified Gold for sales of 500,000 units in June 1980.

Track listing

Personnel 
Kansas
 Steve Walsh – organ, ARP and Moog synthesizers, lead vocals (except on "Down the Road"), backing vocals on "Down the Road" and "Lonely Street", piano on "Down the Road"
 Kerry Livgren – electric and rhythm guitars (except on "Song for America" and "Lamplight Symphony"), Moog and ARP synthesizers, ARP strings, piano (except on "Down the Road")
 Robby Steinhardt – violin, backing vocals, lead vocals on "Down the Road", "Song for America", "Lamplight Symphony"
 Rich Williams – electric, acoustic, and rhythm guitars
 Dave Hope – bass guitar
 Phil Ehart – drums, glockenspiel on "Song for America", Moog drum and gong on "Incomudro - Hymn to the Atman"

Production
Jeff Glixman – producer, remastered edition producer
Wally Gold – producer
Peter Granet – engineer
 Tom Rabstenek – mastering
Ed Lee – art direction
Peter Lloyd – cover painting
Jeff Magid – remastered edition producer

Charts

Certifications

References 

Kansas (band) albums
1975 albums
Albums produced by Jeff Glixman
Albums recorded at Wally Heider Studios
Epic Records albums